Philips van Mallery or Philips de Mallery (Baptised on 6 January 1598, Antwerp –after 1634, Antwerp) was a Flemish engraver and publisher who mainly worked on religious subjects, reproductive prints and emblem books. He worked in Antwerp.

Life
Philips van Mallery was born in Antwerp where he was baptized on 6 January 1598. He was the son of the Antwerp engraver Karel van Mallery and Catharina Galle, the daughter of prominent Antwerp engraver and publisher Philips Galle. He trained with his father. He was registered as a member of the Antwerp Guild of Saint Luke in 1626.
[[File:Philips van Mallery - The Descent into Limbo.jpg|thumb|200px|'The Descent into Limbo]]

The date of his death is not known. It must have been after 1634, as Valerius was registered as his pupil in the Guild register in 1634. In the same year the death of his wife was also registered.

Work
His work consists of Christian religious representations and emblems.

He made the emblems for an emblem book published by Joannes Cnobbaert in Antwerp in 1627 under the title Typus mundi in quo ejus calamitates et pericula nec non divini, humanique amoris antipathia, emblematice proponuntur''.  The Jesuit college of Antwerp was the creator of the book and its students including Philip Fruytiers contributed some of the texts in Latin, French and English.  The emblems presented emblems of earthly versus divine love.

References

External links

Flemish engravers
Flemish publishers
Artists from Antwerp
Painters from Antwerp
17th-century engravers
1598 births